For the Regent's Business School in London - see Regent's Business School London.

Regent Business School is a distance education institution located in Durban, South Africa. It is a private higher education institution, established in 1998 as a post-apartheid empowerment institution. In 2017 Regent Business School joined Honoris United Universities.

History 
At inception, a link was established with the University of Luton in the United Kingdom to offer a range of business and management programmes by supported-learning. Regent Business School is now registered as a private higher education institution and the degrees offered by the School are fully accredited by the Council on Higher Education (CHE).

Programmes 
At the undergraduate level, RBS offers the Bachelor of Commerce (BCom) degree, in addition to various certificate and diploma courses.

At the postgraduate level, it offers the MBA.

Ranking

References

External links  
Official Site

Business schools in South Africa